Eunectes beniensis is a boa species known only from the northeastern parts of Bolivia. Its common names, the Bolivian anaconda and Beni anaconda, are derived from the geographic location of its native habitat: the Beni area of Bolivia. Like all boas, it is nonvenomous.

Taxonomy
It was initially believed to be the result of hybridization between the green (Eunectes murinus) and yellow anaconda (Eunectes notaeus), but was later determined to be a distinct species. Its taxonomic status is unclear due to lack of information and the similarity in appearance to Eunectes notaeus. It is closely related to Eunectes notaeus and Eunectes deschauenseei.

Distribution and habitat
The Bolivian anaconda's habitat usually consists of aquatic muddy, swampy flooded areas.

In April 2022, three researchers published their observation of Bolivian river dolphins play with a large and presumably dead Eunectes beniensis specimen.

References

Bibliography

External links

beniensis
Snakes of South America
Reptiles of Bolivia
Endemic fauna of Bolivia
Reptiles described in 2002